Agnes of Kuenring (ca. 1236 - fl. 1261), was an Austrian noble, courtier of Queen Margaret of Austria and mistress of her spouse, King Ottokar II of Bohemia. She was the first historically documented mistress of a Bohemian sovereign.

Life
Nothing is known about Agnes' early years. It is supposed that when Duchess Margaret of Austria married with Prince Přemysl Ottokar of Bohemia in 1252, she was part of her retinue as a lady-in-waiting.

Described by the chroniclers as one of the most beautiful women in court, with short cut red hair (she was nicknamed Palcéřík for that), Agnes soon captivated the young Prince and, with around only 16 years old, she became his official mistress. One year later, in 1253, Prince Přemysl Otakar succeeded his father as the King of Bohemia.

Queen Margaret was much older than her husband and already barren. It is believed that she offered young Agnes to King Ottokar II as his mistress. This story was described by the chronicler Přibík Pulkava of Radenín:

At first the (Margaret's) shame of infertility was attributed to her husband. When Prince Přemysl learned about that, he said: Give me one of your ladies and prove my potency or impotence. She agreed and gave him one of the girls she loved more than others, the daughter of the House of Kuenring from Austria. In the first year she bore him a son, Nicholas, who was later made Duke of Opava... In addition, she made him father of three daughters ... So the infertility, earlier attributed to the husband, was credited to his wife.

The relationship between King Ottokar II and Agnes was well known by contemporary sources, and perhaps she even accompanied the King on festive occasions, instead of the aging Queen Margaret.

Around the first year of the affair (ca. 1254–55), Agnes gave birth her first child, a son, named Nicholas, later Duke of Opava. It is known that she bore the King more children, but the exact number is contradictory in sources; it is believed that they had three daughters: Agnes (married Bavor III, Lord of Strakonicz), Elisabeth (married Vikard, Lord of Polna and Burgrave of Brünn) and one unknown daughter (wife of Vok, Lord of Kravaře), and another son, Ješek (d. 26 August 1296) (later Priest at Wysehrad).

After the birth of his eldest son, King Ottokar II's main objective was the recognition of this child as his heir. In 1260 he unsuccessfully asked Pope Alexander IV for the legitimation of Nicholas and his siblings. The King divorced Margaret in 1261 and married Kunigunda of Halych. It is not known what happened with Agnes after that, but supposedly she returned to Austria with the former Queen.

Footnotes

References
ŠAROCHOVÁ, G. V. Radostný úděl vdovský. Královny-vdovy přemyslovských Čech. Praha, 2004.
ČECHURA, J. Ženy a milenky českých králů. Vydání 1. Praha ; Akropolis, 1994.

1230s births
13th-century deaths
13th-century Austrian women
Mistresses of Bohemian royalty
13th-century Austrian people
Austrian ladies-in-waiting